Jeff Luc (born February 14, 1992) is a former American football linebacker. He previously attended Florida State University. In June 2012, Luc transferred to play at Cincinnati.  Luc was a 2009 USA Today High School All-American selection.

Originally from Miami, Florida, Luc moved to Port St. Lucie in 2003, where he attended Treasure Coast High School. He registered 103 tackles (14 for a loss) as a senior, and played in the Under Armour All-America Game. Regarded as a four-star recruit by Rivals.com, Luc was listed as the No. 1 inside linebacker prospect in the class of 2010.

Professional career

Miami Dolphins
Luc signed with the Dolphins as an undrafted free agent on May 2, 2015. He was released by the team on September 4, 2015.

New Orleans Saints
On December 29, 2015, Luc was signed to the Saints' practice squad.

Cincinnati Bengals
On January 11, 2016, Luc signed a reserve/future contract with the Bengals. He was released by the team on September 3, 2016.

New York Jets
On January 18, 2017, Luc signed a reserve/future contract with the Jets. On April 26, 2017, Luc was waived by the Jets.

Calgary Stampeders
On May 22, 2017, Luc signed with the Calgary Stampeders of the Canadian Football League.  He was later released by the Stampeders on June 17, 2017.

Toronto Argonauts
On September 20, 2017, Luc signed with the Toronto Argonauts of the Canadian Football League. Luc never played a game in the CFL, and was released after the 2018 preseason.

Atlanta Legends
In 2019, Luc joined the Atlanta Legends of the Alliance of American Football. He made his professional debut with Atlanta, having never appeared in a regular season game in the NFL or CFL; in the eight games played prior to the league suspending operations and filing for bankruptcy in April 2019, he made 32 tackles, 3.5 sacks, and forced a fumble.

References

External links
Toronto Argonauts bio
Florida State Seminoles bio
Cincinnati Bearcats bio
2015 NFL draft profile

1992 births
Living people
Players of American football from Miami
People from Port St. Lucie, Florida
American football linebackers
Florida State Seminoles football players
Cincinnati Bearcats football players
American sportspeople of Haitian descent
Miami Dolphins players
New Orleans Saints players
Cincinnati Bengals players
New York Jets players
Atlanta Legends players
Toronto Argonauts players
Players of Canadian football from Miami